Pombo is a Galician surname. Notable people with the name include:

 Harry "Pombo" Villegas (1940–2019), Cuban revolutionary
 Richard Pombo (born 1961), American politician
 Rafael Pombo (1833–1912), Colombian poet
 Arsenio Linares y Pombo (1848–1914), Spanish military and government official
 Gabriel Pombo (born 1961), Uruguayan writer and lawyer, who is known for his books, essays and interviews relating to serial murderers
 Margarita Diez-Colunje y Pombo (1838–1919), Colombian historian, translator, genealogist

See also 
 Pombas